St. Marys station in St. Marys, Ontario, Canada is a staffed railway station used by Via Rail's Corridor intercity train service and GO Transit's Kitchener line regional train service. The station is served by two daily trains in each direction between Toronto and London (via Kitchener), one of which continues beyond London to Sarnia.

History
St. Marys station was opened in 1907 by the Grand Trunk Railway to provide convenient access to the town centre of St. Marys. The station architect was E. Chandler of Stratford, Ontario. When the Grand Trunk Railway (GTR) was built in 1858, St. Marys was served only by St. Marys Junction station, located 1.5 km north of the current station in an otherwise undeveloped area.  Following pressure from local residents to provide a convenient station closer to the town centre, the GTR opened St. Marys Town station in 1879, located roughly 400 metres south of the current station where the railway crosses James Street South.  However, residents were still not satisfied with the location, leading the GTR to construct the present St. Marys station in 1907, replacing St. Marys Town.

In the 1980s, the Town of St. Marys acquired ownership of the station to protect it from possible closure or demolition.  It completed a restoration and renovation of the station building, with an official reopening on 26 September 1988. The station is designated under Part IV of the Ontario Heritage Act since 1987. 

On October 18, 2021, GO Transit started weekday service though St. Mary's, between Toronto and London. The pilot is an extension of the Kitchener line. The pilot service does not offer Presto access and riders will need to purchase e-tickets from GO website.

Station facilities
The station consists of a single side platform serving a single track.  St Marys station is owned and maintained by the Town of St Marys as a gallery/recreation centre.

In addition to ticketing and waiting facilities, the station building houses the St Marys Station Gallery.

See also

 Quebec City–Windsor Corridor (Via Rail) – trans-provincial passenger rail corridor which includes St. Marys
 Rail transport in Ontario

References

External links

 St. Marys train station on VIARail.ca

Via Rail stations in Ontario
Railway stations in Canada opened in 1907
Grand Trunk Railway stations in Ontario
Railway stations in Perth County, Ontario
Designated heritage railway stations in Ontario
Designated heritage properties in Ontario
Former Amtrak stations in Canada